The women's featherweight (57 kilograms) event at the 2018 Asian Games took place on 21 August 2018 at Jakarta Convention Center Plenary Hall, Jakarta, Indonesia.

Schedule
All times are Western Indonesia Time (UTC+07:00)

Results 
Legend
W — Won by withdrawal

Final

Top half

Bottom half

References

External links
Official website

Taekwondo at the 2018 Asian Games